Luri culture has been developed along with the long history of coexistence among Lurs with surrounding natural elements across the Iranian plateau, and geographical, cultural and religious effects.

Men's clothing

Felt hats
Felt hats (کُلأ نِمِدی): A round felt made that has no edges and sometimes is surrounded by Golvani.

Chugha

Chugha (چوغا):  A masculine wrapper that is used prominently by Bakhtiari Lurs. Chugha is made by sheep wool and usually is woven by Bakhtiari nomads.

References

Clothing by nationality
Costumes
Luri culture